George Perkins Clinton (7 May 1867 – 13 August 1937) was an American botanist, mycologist, and plant pathologist who for thirty-five years worked at the Connecticut Agricultural Experiment Station at New Haven. An expert on smuts and rusts, he was a fellow of the American Association for the Advancement of Science, and the American Academy of Arts and Sciences. Clinton was born in Polo, Illinois, and earned a B.S. and M.S. at the University of Illinois, followed by an M.S. and Sc.D. at Harvard.

References

External links

1867 births
1937 deaths
American botanists
American mycologists
American phytopathologists
Fellows of the American Association for the Advancement of Science
Fellows of the American Academy of Arts and Sciences
People from Polo, Illinois
University of Illinois Urbana-Champaign alumni
Harvard University alumni